Vincent Berthet (born 9 September 1960) is a French former equestrian. He competed in two events at the 1988 Summer Olympics.

References

External links
 

1960 births
Living people
French male equestrians
Olympic equestrians of France
Equestrians at the 1988 Summer Olympics
People from Nérac
Sportspeople from Lot-et-Garonne